Brede Frettem Csiszar is a retired Norwegian professional ice hockey defenceman who participated at the 2010- and 2011 IIHF World Championships as a member of the Norway men's national ice hockey team.

References

External links

Living people
Norwegian ice hockey defencemen
Ice hockey people from Oslo
Mora IK players
Vålerenga Ishockey players
1987 births
Norwegian expatriate ice hockey people
Norwegian expatriate sportspeople in Sweden
Norwegian people of Hungarian descent